Côte-des-Neiges is a neighbourhood of Montreal, Quebec, Canada. It is located at the geographic centre of the Island of Montreal on the western slope of Mount Royal and is part of the borough of Côte-des-Neiges–Notre-Dame-de-Grâce.

Côte-des-Neiges is home to the University of Montreal campus, Polytechnique Montréal, HEC Montréal, Sainte-Justine hospital, the Jewish general hospital, and the Oratoire Saint-Joseph.

History
Historically, the original settlement, the Village of Côte-des-Neiges, was founded in 1862 and annexed by Montreal in two parts in 1908 and 1910.
In 1876, land owner and farmer James Swail began residential subdivisions on the eastern side of Decelles Avenue. In 1906, a large housing development was started in the area, called Northmount Heights, built by developer Northmount Land Company. Much of this area has been expropriated by the Université de Montréal.

Geographically it was bordered by Decelles Avenue to the north east and the Notre Dame des Neiges Cemetery to the south east, Westmount to the southwest and situated on the confluence of Côte-des-Neiges Road and Queen Mary Road. It was one of the last areas of the city of Montreal to be developed and urbanized. Up until World War II it remained a village surrounded by working farms to the north and west. A ski hill to the south near present-day Ridgewood Avenue at the foot of the mountain and present day Saint Joseph's Oratory, was once used regularly by the Montreal Ski Club into the 1940s.

Demographics
Today, the neighbourhood has a large immigrant and student population, and is one of the most densely populated and ethnically diverse neighbourhoods in Canada. With over 100 different ethnic communities, predominantly: Québécois, Filipino, West Indian (Black Canadians), South Asian (Tamils and Bengalis), Jewish, Latin American, Iranian, Chinese, Arab, Vietnamese and most recently Eastern European and African. It is one of the few Montreal neighbourhoods where neither the French nor English language dominate. Both national languages are spoken equally, along with many others by a high number of multilingual speakers.

Education

The Commission scolaire de Montréal (CSDM) operates Francophone public schools. For instance:
 École primaire des Nations
 École primaire Félix-Leclerc
 École primaire Iona

The English Montreal School Board (EMSB) operates Anglophone public schools.

The Montreal Public Libraries Network operates the Côte-des-Neiges library and the Bibliothèque interculturelle.

Université de Montréal, HÉC Montréal, and Polytechnique Montréal are all located within the neighbourhood.

Points of interest
The most notable institutions in Côte-des-Neiges are Université de Montréal, College Brebeuf, Centre hospitalier universitaire Sainte-Justine, the Jewish General Hospital, St. Mary's Hospital, Plaza Côte-des-Neiges, and Saint Joseph's Oratory (the large domed basilica, perched above the neighbourhood, which is by far its most important tourist attraction).

Metro stations

Orange Line
 Snowdon
 Côte-Sainte-Catherine
 Plamondon
 Namur
 De La Savane
 Blue Line
 Snowdon
 Côte-des-Neiges
 Université-de-Montréal
 Édouard-Montpetit

Notable residents
 Xue Yiwei - Chinese writer

References

External links

Town of Montreal, Statistics 2006

Neighbourhoods in Montreal
Côte-des-Neiges–Notre-Dame-de-Grâce